The Ister is a 2004 documentary film directed by David Barison and Daniel Ross.
The film is loosely based on the works of philosopher Martin Heidegger, in particular the 1942 lecture course he delivered, Hölderlins Hymne «Der Ister», concerning a poem, Der Ister, by the German poet Friedrich Hölderlin.
The film had its premiere at the International Film Festival Rotterdam in 2004.

Sources 
The Ister was inspired by a 1942 lecture course delivered by the German philosopher Martin Heidegger, published in 1984 as Hölderlins Hymne "Der Ister". Heidegger's lecture course concerns a poem by the German poet Friedrich Hölderlin about the Danube River.

The film The Ister travels upstream along the Danube toward its source, as several interviewees discuss Heidegger, Hölderlin, and philosophy. The film is also concerned with a number of other themes, including: time, poetry, technology, home, war, politics, myth, National Socialism, the Holocaust, the ancient Greek polis, Sophocles, Antigone, Agnes Bernauer, Edmund Husserl, the 1991 battle of Vukovar, and the 1999 NATO bombing of Yugoslavia.

Interviewees 
The Ister features extensive interviews with the French philosophers Bernard Stiegler, Jean-Luc Nancy, and Philippe Lacoue-Labarthe, as well as with the German film director Hans-Jürgen Syberberg. Other interviews are conducted with a bridge engineer (Nemanja Calic), an amateur botanist (Tobias Maier), and a Romanian archaeologist (Alexandru Suceveanu).

An extended interview with philosopher Werner Hamacher is also included as one of the "extra features" on the DVD.

Locations 
The film travels upriver: from the Danube Delta, opening onto the Black Sea in Romania, to the source of the river in the Black Forest of southern Germany, moving along the way through the Histria (Sinoe) archaeological site, through Novi Sad in Serbia, Vukovar in Croatia, Budapest, Dunaföldvár, and Dunaújváros in Hungary, and Vienna and the Mauthausen-Gusen concentration camp in Austria. Also featured are the Walhalla temple near Regensburg, the Befreiungshalle at Kelheim, the tomb of Agnes Bernauer, and the castle at Sigmaringen to which Marshal Pétain fled in 1945.

Notable places from Heidegger's own life which feature in the film include his birthplace in Meßkirch, his hut at Todtnauberg, and the lecture theatre at Freiburg University where he delivered his infamous Rectoratsrede (rectorial address).

Eventually the film arrives at Donaueschingen, and at the Breg and the Brigach, the two tributaries whose confluence marks the point at which the river becomes known as the Danube. The film then travels upstream along the Breg, past Vöhrenbach and Furtwangen, in search of the "true" mountain source of the Danube.

Structure 
The Ister is divided into five chapters, plus a prologue and epilogue:
Prologue. The myth of Prometheus, or The birth of technics. Bernard Stiegler tells the myth of Prometheus.
Chapter 1. Now come fire! "In which the philosopher Bernard Stiegler conjugates technology and time, and guides us from the mouth of the Danube to the city of Vukovar in Croatia."
Chapter 2. Here we wish to build. "In which the philosopher Jean-Luc Nancy takes up the question of politics and guides us through the Republic of Hungary."
Chapter 3. When the trial has passed. "In which philosopher Philippe Lacoue-Labarthe conducts us from the technopolis of Vienna to the depths of the concentration camp at Mauthausen, confronting Heidegger's most provocative statement concerning technology."
Chapter 4. The rock has need of cuts. "In which philosopher Bernard Stiegler returns to guide us deeper into the questions of mortality and history, as we emerge from Mauthausen to the Hall of Liberation in Germany."
Chapter 5. What that river does, no-one knows. "In which the German artist and director Hans-Jürgen Syberberg guides us through the upper Danube, to the source of the river and beyond."
Epilogue. Heidegger reads Hölderlin. Heidegger reads Hölderlin's hymn, "Der Ister."

Soundtrack 
Three excerpts from classical works feature in the film:
Anton Bruckner, Symphony No. 4 in E-flat major, first movement.
Richard Wagner, "Siegfried's Funeral March," from Götterdämmerung, Act 3.
Franz Schubert, Impromptu D. 899 (Op. 90), No. 1 in C minor.

Premiere and awards 
The Ister premiered at the International Film Festival Rotterdam on 23 January 2004. It has won two awards:
The Prix du Groupement National des Cinémas de Recherche (GNCR) at the Festival International du Documentaire de Marseille (August 2004).
The Prix de l’AQCC (Association Québécoise des Critiques/Quebec Association of Film Critics) at the Festival du Nouveau Cinéma in Montreal (October 2004).

Additionally, Robert Koehler, film critic for Variety, listed The Ister as the second best film released theatrically in the United States in 2006.

Reviews 
On Rotten Tomatoes, the film holds an 88% approval rating, based on 8 reviews, with an average rating of 7.1/10. On Metacritic, the film holds a score of 75 out of 100, based on 6 reviews.

 Coloring Outside the Lines, by Michael Atkinson
 The Ister: Between the Documentary and Heidegger’s Lecture Course Politics, Geographies, and Rivers, by Babette Babich
 A River Runs Through It, by Daniel Birnbaum
 Draggin' the River, by Carloss James Chamberlin
 The Ister, by Chris Chang, Film Comment, vol. 46, no. 1 (Jan./Feb. 2010), p. 82.
 Killing the Gatekeeper, by Matthew Clayfield
 The Duck and the Philosopher: Rhythms of Editing and Thinking between Bernard Stiegler and The Ister, by Patrick Crogan
 The Ister: Cinema's Interruption, by Linda Daley
 The Ister, by Cheryl Danieri-Ratcliffe
 The Ister, by Tom Dawson
 Heidegger, Technology and Time: Review of the Film The Ister, by Matthew Del Nevo
 "The Ister," reviewed by Roy Elveton, German Studies Review 29 (2006): 480–481.
 The Ister, by Gareth Evans
 The Ister: Search for the Source, by Hamish Ford
 The Ister, by Scott Foundas
 The Ister, by Philip French
 Flow of Rich Philosophy, by Philippa Hawker
 The Ister, by Philippa Hawker
 The Ister, by Eric Henderson
 Mystic River, by J. Hoberman
 Philosophers on Celluloid: Sartre, Beauvoir, Heidegger, and the French Heideggerians, by Jonathan Judaken
 Time and Tide (and Torrents of Discourse), by Peter Kemp
 Incisions on the Rock, by Adam Kirsch
 The Nonbiodegradable, by Dragan Kujundzic
 A Journey Up the Danube, Philosophy Included, by Nathan Lee
 The Ister, by Adrian Martin
 The Ister, by John McMurtrie
 Time and the River (and Heidegger), by Peter Monaghan
 The Ister, by Deborah Nichols
 From Scardanelli to Orfée, by Scott Nygren
 L’homme sans qualités, by Gaël Pasquier 
 The Camera in the Water Closet, by Dominic Pettman
 The Ister, by Jonathan Rosenbaum
 The Ister, by Jamie Russell
 Against the Stream: Remarks on the Film The Ister, by Galili Shahar
 The Ister, by Michael Sicinski
 In Search of Heidegger, by Ruth Starkman
 The Ister, by James van Maanen
 “He Appears, However, Almost to Go Backwards”: Impossibly Short Notes on The Ister, by Mike Wood

References

External links 
 The Ister at Icarus Films
 The Ister: An Excerpt
 The Ister at the Internet Movie Database

2004 films
2004 documentary films
Australian documentary films
Documentary films about philosophers
Films about philosophy
Friedrich Hölderlin
Martin Heidegger
Films set in the Black Forest